The Lac au Bouleau is a body of water crossed from south to north by the Petit Saguenay River, in the unorganized territory of Mont-Élie, in the Charlevoix-Est Regional County Municipality of the administrative region Capitale-Nationale, in Quebec, in Canada.

The south-eastern part of lac au Sable is served by the forest road R064.

Forestry is the sector's main economic activity; recreotourism activities, second.

The surface of Lac au Bouleau is usually frozen from the end of November to the beginning of April, however safe circulation on the ice is generally done from mid-December to the end of March.

Geography 
The main watersheds neighboring "Lac au Bouleau" are:
 north side: Emmuraillé Lake, Pilote Lake, Petit Saguenay River;
 east side: McLagan Lake, Étienne Brook, Deschênes Lake, Deschênes River;
 south side: Lac au Sable, ruisseau au Sable, Petit Saguenay River;
 west side: lac Bazile, coulée du Bazile.

The Petit Saguenay river successively crosses Sable Lake from south to north, Lac au Bouleau and the eastern part of Lac Emmuraillé.

The mouth of Lac au Bouleau is located at:
  west of lac Deschênes;
  south of the village center Petit-Saguenay;
  south of the confluence of the Petit Saguenay river and Anse du Petit Saguenay located on the south shore of the Saguenay River.

Toponymy 
Birch is a type of tree common in cold and temperate regions. This tree has white bark and small leaves. Its wood is often used in carpentry and cabinetmaking. It is also used in the manufacture of paper.

The toponym lac au Bouleau was formalized on December 5, 1968, by the Commission de toponymie du Québec.

See also 
Le Fjord-du-Saguenay Regional County Municipality

References 

Lakes of Capitale-Nationale
Charlevoix-Est Regional County Municipality